John VII was Catholicos-Patriarch of All Georgia, from 1208 to 1210. He belonged to the group of reactionary monks that supported Georgian-Dyophysitism and condemned Armenian Miaphysitism. His activities resulted by baptizing Ivane Mkhargrdzeli, the ruler of Dvin and Vaspurakan, and a great number of Armenians with him.

Sources
B. Lominadze, Georgian Soviet Encyclopedia, V, p. 187, Tbilisi, 1980

13th-century people from Georgia (country)
Catholicoses and Patriarchs of Georgia (country)
Year of birth unknown